is a village located in Niigata Prefecture, Japan. , the village had an estimated population of 7,824, and a population density of 311 persons per km².

Geography
Yahiko is located in a coastal region of central Niigata Prefecture, but is not on the coast. Yahiko lies on the south side of Mount Yahiko. This mountain and nearby Mount Kakuda, stand alone on the Sea of Japan  coast not far from Niigata City. Yahiko has one of the oldest family owned hotels in Niigata prefecture called Yamamotokan.

Surrounding municipalities
Niigata Prefecture
Nagaoka
Tsubame
Niigata

Climate
Yahiko has a Humid climate (Köppen Cfa) characterized by warm, wet summers and cold winters with heavy snowfall.  The average annual temperature in Yahiko is 13.0 °C. The average annual rainfall is 2081 mm with September as the wettest month. The temperatures are highest on average in August, at around 26.1 °C, and lowest in January, at around 1.3 °C.

Demographics
Per Japanese census data, the population of Yahiko has remained relatively steady over the past 50 years.

History
The area of present-day Yahiko was part of ancient Echigo Province, and developed as a settlement around  Yahiko-jinja, a Shinto shrine which was established in the 8th century.  The modern village was established within Nishikanbara District, Niigata on April 1, 1889 with the creation of the municipalities system. The present shrine was rebuilt in 1916.  The earlier shrine buildings were destroyed by a 1912 fire which started in the village.  It is the only village left in its district after the two towns from the same district merged into the city of Tsubame on March 20, 2006.

Education
Yahiko has one public elementary school and one public middle school operated by the village government, but no public high school.

Transportation

Railway
 JR East - Yahiko Line
  -

Ropeway
Yahikoyama Ropeway

Highway
 Yahiko is not on any national expressway or highway

Sightseeing

Places
 Yahiko Shrine
 Yahiko Onsen (hot spring)
 Yahiko Velodrome
 Yahikoyama Ropeway and Skyline

Events
 Chrysanthemum Festival (in November)

References

External links 

Official Website 

 
Villages in Niigata Prefecture